Bernardo López Piquer (20 August 1799/1800, Valencia – 1 August 1874, Madrid) was a Spanish portrait painter; noted especially for his pastels.

Biography
His father was the portrait painter, Vicente López Portaña. His brother, Luis, also became a painter. Later, they would work together at Orihuela Cathedral.

He and his brother enrolled at the Real Academia de Bellas Artes de San Fernando in 1825. Thanks to the influence of his father, he was able to find work at the Royal Palace, where he painted portraits in his father's style.

After 1844, he held the position of Director of Studies at the Real Academia. He served as President of the Painting Section from 1845 until his death. From 1843, he was a court painter for Isabel II and was the "Primer Pintor" from 1858 to 1868, when he was dismissed following the Glorious Revolution.

Notable works 
Retrato de la Reina Madre María Teresa de Braganza
Retrato de Isabel II
Retrato de Vicente López
San Pascual Bailón adorando la Eucaristía
Retrato de D. Manuel Fernández Varela, Comisario General de Cruzada
Los alabarderos José Díaz y Francisco Torán

References

External links

ArtNet: More works by López.

Spanish people of English descent
Spanish people of Dutch descent
Spanish people of Flemish descent
1801 births
1874 deaths
People from Valencia
19th-century Spanish painters
Spanish male painters
Real Academia de Bellas Artes de San Fernando alumni
19th-century Spanish male artists